Osei Tutu II (born Nana Barima Kwaku Duah; 6 May 1950) is the 16th Asantehene, enstooled on 26 April 1999. By name, Otumfuo Osei Tutu II is in direct succession to the 17th-century founder of the Ashanti Empire, Otumfuo Osei Tutu I. He is also the Chancellor of the Kwame Nkrumah University of Science and Technology. Otumfuo Osei Tutu II is the Grand Patron of the Grand Lodge of Ghana and the Sword Bearer of the United Grand Lodge of England.

Biography

Early life 

He was born on 6 May 1950 and named Nana Barima Kwaku Duah, the third son and youngest of the five children (three sons and two daughters) of Nana Afia Kobi Serwaa Ampem II, Asantehemaa (Queen-mother of the Ashanti). His father Nana Kwame Boakye-Dankwa was from Kantinkyere in Ashanti and was also the Brehyia Duke of Asante. Nana Kwame Boakye-Dankwa died on 1 January 2002, in Kumasi, Ashanti.

Otumfuo Osei Tutu was named after his paternal grandfather, Ohenenana Kwaku Duah (Nana Agari), Brahyiahene, of Kantinkyiren in the Atwima district.

His siblings include Nana Ama Konadu, (Nana Konadu Yiadom III) who is the 14th Asanteheemaa, as well as the late Barima Kwabena Poku, Barima Akwasi Prempeh.

When he was about five years old, Otumfuo moved into the royal household of his uncle, Oheneba Mensah Bonsu, the Hiahene, enstooled in 1952, as early preparation for his future role.

Osei Tutu has six children. His father had other offspring from other marriages, including Yaw Boateng, Kwaku Duah, Kwabena Agyei-Bohyen, Afua Sarpong and Ama Agyemang (Kumasi, Ashanti), Fredua Agyeman Prempeh, Nana Kwasi Agyemang Prempeh and Nana Kwasi Boachie Gyambibi (Kumasi, Ashanti).

The Asantehene Osei Tutu II's name at birth, Nana Barima Kwaku Duah, is the name of the Asante monarch's paternal grandfather.

Education 

He had his elementary education in Kumasi and in 1964, went on to the Sefwi Wiaso Secondary School where he obtained his 'O' Level and was taught by the late Omanhene of Sefwi Wiawso, Nana Kwadwo Aduhene II who was a cousin of Otumfuo's guardian uncle, Oheneba Mensah Bonsu, Hiahene. He also attended the Osei Kyeretwie Secondary School (OKESS). He studied accountancy studies at the erstwhile Institute of Professional Studies, which is today known as University of Professional Studies in Accra. He then enrolled at the Polytechnic of North London (now London Metropolitan University), where he earned the Diploma in Management and Administration. He was awarded an honorary doctorate by the university at a ceremony at the Barbican Centre on 11 January 2006.

Private sector career 

Between 1981 and 1985, he was a senior consultant at the Mutual of Omaha Insurance Company in Toronto, Canada.

He returned to London in 1985 and became the Personnel Officer at the HPCC Stonebridge Bus Garage Project, in the London Borough of Brent. He then founded his own mortgage finance firm, Primoda Financial Services Limited, located on Kilburn High Road, North West London. He returned to his native Ghana in 1989 to start a transport business, the Transpomech International (Ghana) Limited.

Asantehene (1999–present)

The Asantehene is highly revered in the Ashanti Region of Ghana. Osei Tutu has frequently commented on the work of Ghanaian politicians.

He received international media attention after some of the Ashanti crown jewels were allegedly stolen from an Oslo hotel in October 2012 when he was attending a conference in the Norwegian capital.

In August 2019, he celebrated the Akwasidae with the Ghanaian community in the United Kingdom whilst on a short visit there. Dignitaries at the function included Paapa Owusu Ankomah, the Ghana High Commissioner to the United Kingdom.

In February 2020, he became the first person to receive the 'Pillar of Peace Award'. This was in recognition of the effort that he put into restoring peace to the Kingdom of Dagbon which spanned nearly two decades.

He has also received the 2019 CIMG President's Special Award.

Residence

Asantehene Otumfuo Osei Tutu II of the Empire of Asante resides at the Manhyia Palace in Kumasi, the capital city of Ashanti region and the Empire of Asante.

Role in restoring peace to the Kingdom of Dagbon 

President John Agyekum Kufuor instituted the Committee of Eminent Chiefs, headed by Osei Tutu II, to intervene in the 2002 Dagbon chieftaincy crisis. The committee's mandate included facilitating negotiations and mediating talks between the Andani and Abudu royal families, and drawing a roadmap for the restoration of peace in the Kingdom of Dagbon. The committee presented their recommendations to the Government of Ghana on 21 November 2018. The government implemented the recommendations that included the performance of the funerals of Mahamadu IV and Yakubu II from 14 December 2018 to 18 January 2019. These were then followed by the investiture of Bukali II as substantive regent of the Kingdom of Dagbon. In December 2019, Bukali II paid a courtesy call on Otumfuo Osei Tutu at the Manhyia Palace, to express his gratitude for the role the Asante king played in the peace process.

20th anniversary celebration 

Osei Tutu II's 20th anniversary commemoration took place on 21 April 2019, at the Dwabirem of the Manhyia Palace. This was at the grand durbar of the Akwasidaekese. Dignitaries like Nana Addo Dankwa Akufo-Addo, Michael Ashwin Satyandre Adhin the vice president of Suriname and Torgbui Sri, the Awomefia of the Anlo state were in attendance. Other dignitaries included Diplomats and royals from Namibia, Kuwait, Germany, China, Morocco, Latvia, Botswana and Palestine. On 19 April 2019,there was a sod cutting ceremony to launch the construction of a hostel at the Kwame Nkrumah University of Science and Technology. The next day the sod was cut for some other projects like the GUSS Sports Complex, Beach Soccer Park and Hospital Car Park.

Destoolment of sub chiefs 

In June 2019, Osei Tutu II destooled two chiefs for various offences against the stool. Akyamfou Kwame Akowuah was dethroned for violating the Great Oath of Asanteman. Nana Ahenkro Sei Ababio III was also deposed for disregarding directives about chieftaincy and land disputes. In April 2018, the Atwimahene, Nana Antwi Agyei Brempong II was destooled by the Asantehene. He was found guilty of misuse of the Great Oath, flouting the monarch's decrees about land administration and several other misdeeds. He was later pardoned and reinstated. In 2009 Nana Kofi Agyei Bi III, the chief of Atwimah was destooled for fraudulent sale of land. In 2015, Nana Mensah Bonsu chief of Pakyi Number One was destooled for inciting the youth to wreak havoc in the area. In 2002 Osei Tutu destooled Ohenenana Kwaku Duah, the chief of Bonwire, for insubordination and a blatant disregard of customs in the installation and deposition of his sub chiefs. In July 2020, the Bantamahene was summoned before the monarch on charges of land encroachment and the diversion of the Subin river without permission. He was pardoned after some of the divisional chiefs pleaded for clemency. He was ordered to reverse all action in the land encroachment and river diversion and also fined.

Commitment to environmental protection and conservation 

In July 2019, Otumfuo Osei Tutu II announced his devotion to protect the water bodies of the Asante Kingdom. This would involve the planting of 2.5 million trees around Lake Bosomtwe and would cover 400 hectares. This would aid in improving the ecosystem, cushion climate change and enhance environmental awareness among the communities around the lake. The tree planting initiative is a collaboration between the Oheneba Poku Foundation and Manhyia Palace. The Forestry Commission, the Environmental Protection Agency (EPA), the Water Resources Commission, the Ghana Tourism Authority, UNESCO, the District Assemblies of Bosome-Freho and Bosumtwe, and the Lake Bosomtwe Community Resources Management Areas (CREMA), which is an NGO are the other stakeholders.

Otumfuo Lottery Game 

The Asantehene has joined forces with the National Lottery Authority (NLA) and is preparing to launch the Otumfuo Lottery Game. This is a fundraising initiative to support the Otumfuo Charity Foundation. In May 2019, a working committee that composed of members of the National Lottery Authority (NLA), the State Enterprise Commission (SEC) and the Asante state's governance team, presented a report to the monarch for approval. The National Association of Private Lotto Operators and Agents in Ghana expressed their preparedness to embrace the game so its objective would be achieved.

Otumfuo Osei Tutu II Foundation (OOTIIF) 

The Otumfuo Osei Tutu II Charity Foundation was officially launched in April 2009. It was established to enable the monarch serve his people in two of his main focus areas: education and health. In line with this, the "Otumfuo Educational Fund" was established in 1999 for the enhancement of education for Ghanaians and the Serwah Ampem AIDS Foundation for children who had HIV/AIDS or were affected by it. The Educational fund had by April 2019, supported 301,980 students with scholarships and other forms of support. This number is made up of 25,756  students who received full scholarships and 276,224 others who received one form of financial support or the other. By October 2019, over 600 teachers had been recognized in the foundation's teacher awards program. This was to show appreciation to teachers who were working in poverty stricken areas and had no access to electricity, telephones, potable water and other basic amenities. Many teachers refuse to be posted to these areas due to the impoverished conditions of living. The awards are in the forms of money, laptops, refrigerators and scholarships up to PhD level studies. 

In October 2017, Global Communities partnered with the Foundation to start up the Youth Inclusive Entrepreneurial Development Initiative for Employment (YIEDIE) project. The initiative was for five years and aimed at creating opportunities in the construction industry, to benefit economically disadvantaged youth. Global Communities, a non-profit organization with a global reach, works with communities to create sustainable changes that improve the lives and livelihoods of the less privileged. The implementation of this project was in conjunction with the Mastercard Foundation. The project operates in Ghana's five largest cities: Accra, Kumasi, Sekondi-Takoradi, Ashaiman, and Tema and will provide opportunities for at least 23,700 youth, between ages 17–24, who earn less than $2 per day.

In November 2017, 4,946 children from eight districts in the Ashanti, Ahafo, Bono and Bono East Regions (Sekyere North, Bekwai Municipality, Atwima Mponua, Bibaini-Anwhiaso-Bekwai, Bosomtwe, Offinso Municipality, New Edubaise and Goaso district) were given free computer training. This was done by a collaboration between Otumfuo-Agroecom Mobile Library Project (OAMLP), which is a subsidiary of the Otumfuo Charity Foundation, and Agroecom Ghana Ltd, a cocoa buying company. This initiative is in line with its aim to bridge the gap in learning conditions between the urban and less privileged communities and instill reading and the use of ICT in pupils at the basic level.

In January 2019, an agreement was entered into by the Foundation and Young Educators Foundation who are the organizers of the ''Spelling Bee" competition. This was geared towards making the literary programs of the Young Educators Foundation available to less privileged communities and public schools in the Ashanti Region. This would give 100 students the opportunity to benefit from the program every year.

In May 2020, junior high school students in Kumasi received over 2000 books and dictionaries. Some of the communities that benefited from this gesture were Bohyen, Aduato, Adumanu, Ampabame and South Suntreso. This was aimed at keeping students academically active while schools were closed to control the spread of COVID-19.

In June 2020, the Foundation donated books to about 750 Junior High School students from 11 basic schools in the Ahafo Region of Ghana. This was to facilitate the excellent performance of the students, especially in the Basic Education Certificate Examination (BECE).

In July 2020, AngloGold Ashanti teamed up with the Otumfuo Osei Tutu II Charity Foundation and the Obuasi Municipal and East Educational Directorates to roll out a Live Radio and Distance Learning Programme in Obuasi. This was to ensure continuation in learning, even though schools had been closed down to control COVID-19. The Foundation was supported by the mine with an amount of 150,000 Ghana Cedis (GH₵) for the purchase and distribution of 10,000 copies of Readers and Workbooks to Junior High School Students in the catchment area.

In March 2021, the name of the foundation was changed to Otumfuo Osei Tutu II Foundation(OOTIIF). This come about as a result of the Otumfuo Education Fund, the Serwaa Ampem Foundation for Children and the Otumfuo Osei Tutu II Charity Foundation being merged into one charity with a new board of trustees and management. The new board was constituted of Nana Prof. Oheneba Boachie-Adjei Woahene II as the chair and Sir Samuel Esson Jonah, Dr. Kwaku Mensa-Bonsu, Mrs. Margaret Boateng Sekyere,Dr. Kwame Bawuah-Edusei, Rev. Akua Ofori-Boateng, Mr. Andrew Asamoah, Nana Akuoku Boateng and Mrs. Mariam Agyeman Gyasi Jawhary.

Personal life 
Osei Tutu II is married to Julia Osei Tutu and they have 7 children.

References

External links
 

1950 births
Living people
People from Kumasi
Ghanaian Anglicans
Ghanaian leaders
Ghanaian Freemasons
Ashanti royalty
Ghanaian royalty
Ashanti monarchs
University of Professional Studies alumni